Katia Piccolini (born 15 January 1973) is a former tennis player from Italy, who competed on the WTA Tour from 1988 to 1999.  She reached a career-high ranking of No. 37 in July 1991 and competed in the 1992 Summer Olympics. Other career highlights include reaching the third round of the 1990 US Open and winning the singles title at the San Marino Open in 1991.

ITF Circuit finals

Singles: 12 (7–5)

References

External links
 
 
 
 

1973 births
Italian female tennis players
Olympic tennis players of Italy
Tennis players at the 1992 Summer Olympics
Living people
People from L'Aquila
Mediterranean Games gold medalists for Italy
Mediterranean Games medalists in tennis
Competitors at the 1991 Mediterranean Games
Sportspeople from the Province of L'Aquila
20th-century Italian women